Maria Breuer (born 7 March 1953) is a German footballer. She played in one match for the Germany women's national football team in 1983.

References

External links
 

1953 births
Living people
German women's footballers
Germany women's international footballers
Place of birth missing (living people)
Women's association footballers not categorized by position